A number of ships of the French Navy have been named Milan, for the Kite:
  (1771–1784), a Lévrier-class cutter
  (1807–1809), a 16-gun brig, captured by the British and brought into Royal Navy service as HMS Achates
  (1849–1865), a steam aviso
 , an unprotected cruiser launched in 1884 and struck in 1908.
 , an  launched in 1931 and lost in 1942.

Citations and references
Citations

References
  (1671-1870)

French Navy ship names